Sydney Bernard Smith (4 August 1936 – 11 October 2008) was a Scots-Irish poet, dramatist, actor and novelist.

Biography
He was born in Glasgow, his father was from Forfar, Angus and his mother from Co. Clare. He was brought up in Portstewart, County Londonderry in Northern Ireland.  

He was educated at Clongowes Wood College, Queen's College, Oxford and the University of Iowa International Writer's programme. He later taught at Clongowes Wood College.  He also worked as a teacher at Sandymount High School in Dublin, the University of Iowa and Ithaca College in Ithaca, New York. He also taught in Germany and Spain.

Smith was married to Cynthia (née Hoxie) and they had three sons (Daniel, Sydney George, Cormac) and a daughter (Emer). At the time of his death he lived in Dundalk, County Louth in Ireland.

Awards
 1982 elected a member of Aosdana

Publications

Poetry
 Girl With Violin (The Dolmen Press [Poetry Ireland Editions 3], Dublin 1968)
 Priorities (Raven Arts Press, Dublin 1979)
 Sensualities (Raven, 1981)
 Scurrilities (Raven 1981)
 New and Selected Poems (Raven, 1984).

Plays
 Sherca (1976, published Newark, Del, Proscenium Press, 1979)
 Don Bosco, Grainne and the Dole (1977)
 The Impertinence of being Frank (1978)
 The Illaunapsppie Triangle (1978)
 Houseparty (1979)
 Swim Away Babies (1984)
 On Course for Brazil (1985)
 How to Roast a Strasbourg Goose ( Dublin Theatre Festival, 1985)
 Up for Bloomsday (1985)
 The 2nd Grand Confabulation of Drum Ceat (Dublin Theatre Festival,Andrews Lane Theatre, 1989)
 Reason not the Need (1992)
 The Shaming of the True (1995).

Novels
 Flannery (Dublin, Odell & Adair, 1991)
 The Book of Shannow (published in literary magazines)

Other
His work was broadcast on RTÉ, BBC and Channel 4, and staged in Ireland; at the Edinburgh Festival Fringe; and in the United States.

References

1936 births
Irish poets
2008 deaths
People from Portstewart
People educated at Clongowes Wood College
20th-century poets
Male actors from County Londonderry